, often stylized as 5★Star Grand Prix 2021 was the tenth annual professional wrestling tournament under the Stardom 5Star Grand Prix Tournament branch promoted by the Japanese promotion World Wonder Ring Stardom. It took place between July 31 and September 25, 2021 with a limited attendance due in part to the COVID-19 pandemic at the time.

Storylines
The show featured professional wrestling matches that resulted from scripted storylines, where wrestlers portrayed villains, heroes, or less distinguishable characters in the scripted events that built tension and culminated in a wrestling match or series of matches.

On the sixth night of the tournament which took place in the Korakuen Hall on August 13, it was announced that the shows from August 14 and August 15 were canceled due to a certain number of female wrestlers being identified as contacts for a person infected with COVID-19. On the same night, after losing the Future of Stardom Championship match to Unagi Sayaka, Mai Sakurai was presented as the newest member of Cosmic Angels and was announced to undergo a newcomer "challenge" against ten opponents during the tournament.

After a couple of lockdowns were announced to be taking place during the event, the original schedule had been slightly changed. So due to several wrestlers undergoing home isolation, the shows from August 21 and 22 were also cancelled.

On the eight night from August 29, Hazuki appeared to confront Mayu Iwatani as she was cleared for her in-ring return.

On the ninth night from September 4 it was revealed that Waka Tsukiyama from Actwres girl'Z would make her debut in Stardom. Just as Mai Sakurai, she was announced to undergo a rookie "challenge" against ten different opponents.

The seventeenth night portraited the final of the tournament on September 25 with Syuri defeating Momo Watanabe to win it. She revealed that she will challenge Utami Hayashishita for the World of Stardom Championship on December 29 at "Stardom Dream Queendom". Utami Hayashishita versus Takumi Iroha for the World of Stardom Championship, Tam Nakano versus Mayu Iwatani for the Wonder of Stardom Championship and Syuri against Konami for the SWA World Championship were also announced for the Stardom 10th Anniversary Grand Final Osaka Dream Cinderella pay-per-view from October 9.

Participants
This is a list of participants who changed a couple of times during the event. Despite being listed as a participant, Natsuko Tora was replaced by Fukigen Death after suffering a legitimate knee injury at Yokohama Dream Cinderella 2021 in Summer on July 4. Takumi Iroha from Marvelous That's Women Pro Wrestling was announced as the mystery participant at the July 17 press conference.

The tournament featured twenty wrestlers, being the biggest tournament to date, equally divided into two distinctive blocks with the two winners of their respective blocks moving on to the finals. One mystery competitor, usually a guest from another promotion, is often revealed on the first night of the event. But at Hyakka Ryoran! Press Conference held on July 17, it was revealed that Takumi Iroha was set to make her return to the promotion as the mystery competitor and Fukigen Death would replace Natsuko Tora after the latter's injury.

*Noted underneath are the champions who held their titles at the time of the tournament.
{| class="wikitable sortable" align="left-center" 
|-
!Wrestler
!Unit
!Notes
|-
|AZM
|Queen's Quest
|
|-style="background-color:#e3e3e3"
|Giulia
|Donna Del Mondo
|Goddess of Stardom ChampionPulled out of the tournament on September 9 due to injury
|-
|Himeka
|Donna Del Mondo
|
|-
|Fukigen Death
|Oedo Tai
|Replaced Natsuko Tora
|-
|Koguma
|Stars
|
|-
|Konami
|Oedo Tai
|
|-
|Maika
|Donna Del Mondo
|
|-
|Mayu Iwatani
|Stars
|
|-
|Mina Shirakawa
|Cosmic Angels
|Artist of Stardom Champion
|-
|Momo Watanabe
|Queen's Quest
|
|-style="background-color:#e3e3e3"
|Natsuko Tora
|Oedo Tai
|Pulled out of the tournament due to injury
|-
|Natsupoi
|Donna Del Mondo
|
|-
|Ruaka
|Oedo Tai
|
|-
|Saki Kashima
|Oedo Tai
|
|-
|Saya Kamitani
|Queen's Quest
|
|-
|Starlight Kid
|Oedo Tai
|High Speed Champion
|-style="background: gold"
|Syuri
|Donna Del Mondo
|WinnerGoddess of Stardom ChampionSWA World Champion
|-
|Takumi Iroha
|Unaffiliated
|Announced as the "X"
|-
|Tam Nakano
|Cosmic Angels
|Wonder of Stardom ChampionArtist of Stardom Champion
|-
|Unagi Sayaka
|Cosmic Angels
|Artist of Stardom ChampionFuture of Stardom Champion
|-
|Utami Hayashishita
|Queen's Quest
|World of Stardom Champion

Results

Blocks

Notes

See Also
G1 Climax
N-1 Victory

References

External links
Page Stardom World

2021 in professional wrestling
World Wonder Ring Stardom shows
Professional wrestling in Japan
Women's professional wrestling tournaments